William Edward Hilsman (May 22, 1900 – 1964) was an American Democratic politician who served in the Missouri General Assembly.  He served in the Missouri Senate between 1949 and 1961.

Born in St. Louis, Missouri, he was educated in the public schools and parochial schools.  On September 8, 1928, Hilsman married Mary Loretto Hayes.  He worked in the insurance business and served in the 138th Infantry during World War I.

References

External links
 The Political Graveyard: Index to Politicians, Hillidge to Hinerman

1900 births
1964 deaths
20th-century American politicians
Democratic Party Missouri state senators
Politicians from St. Louis